ELINCS may refer to:
 EHR-Lab Interoperability and Connectivity Specification, in healthcare software interoperability
 European List of Notified Chemical Substances, within chemical substance inventory